Mulgaras are the two small rat-sized species in the genus Dasycercus. They are marsupial carnivores, closely related to the Tasmanian devil and the quolls, that live in deserts and spinifex grasslands of arid Australia. They are nocturnal, but occasionally "sunbathe" in the entrance of the burrow in which they dwell. Their kidneys are highly developed to excrete extremely concentrated urine to preserve water, as the animals rarely drink. They feed mostly on insects, but also eat reptiles and small mammals. They are seasonal breeders and breed from June to September. The pouch comprises two lateral folds of skin.

Recent research has shown two distinct species, which are very similar. The brush-tailed mulgara (D. blythi, previously classified as D.cristicauda), has an uncrested tail, two upper premolars, and six nipples. The crest-tailed mulgara (previously D. hillieri, but now reclassified as D. cristicauda) has a crested tail, three upper premolars, and eight nipples.

The generic name Dasycercus means "hairy tail".

Species identification

A long history of confusion exists when classifying mulgaras, and only recently has confidence in the taxonomy of  the two species been gained. Identification of the species has been greatly assisted by detailed genetic and morphological studies of museum specimens. The most distinguishing feature in identifying the two species is the crest of hair on the tail. The crest-tailed mulgara has a crest of long black hairs on the upper side of the distal end of the tail, while the brush-tailed mulgara has a brush of black hairs along the final two-thirds of the tail. The two species also have a slightly different dental formation, which is difficult to observe in live animals, and the brush-tailed mulgara has six nipples while the crest-tailed Mulgara has eight. Mulgaras are distributed through the arid regions of  Australia where they live in short burrows. The crest-tailed mulgara, previously referred to as the Ampurta, is listed as vulnerable.

Torpor
Both species of mulgaras use torpor daily. Studies have shown they use torpor in the wild and in the lab setting. In contrast to most other mammals, mulgaras increase their use of torpor during pregnancy. By conserving energy with torpor, pregnant females can increase their body mass, but it seems they use it to increase fat storage, for lactation later.  Pregnant females and breeding males both use torpor during the winter. Free-ranging males, however, only display torpor briefly during the reproductive season, and instead increase their use of torpor after the breeding season is over.

See also

 Angas Downs Indigenous Protected Area

References

Dasyuromorphs
Mammals of the Northern Territory
Taxa named by Wilhelm Peters